Samuel Elmgren (1771–1834) was a Finnish painter.

Elmgren was born in Turku. He was commissioned to primarily paint religious-themed murals and altarpieces for churches. Between 1830 and 1832 he painted the church of Ilomantsi with one hundred angels, a number of bible characters and stories, and also the altarpiece. His works also include altar paintings and decorations for the Leppävirta church, and the altarpiece for the Kiihtelysvaara wooden church in 1831.  He died at Ilomantsi in 1834.

References
 Heikki Hanka, a hundred angel's church, Ilomantsi image of the Church for two centuries, Minerva 2003

1771 births
1834 deaths
18th-century Finnish painters
18th-century male artists
Finnish male painters
19th-century Finnish painters
19th-century Finnish male artists